Frans Willy Weisglas (born 8 August 1946) is a retired Dutch politician, diplomat and economist. A member of the People's Party for Freedom and Democracy (VVD), he served as Speaker of the House of Representatives from 16 May 2002 until 30 November 2006. He was a member of the House of Representatives from 16 September 1982 until 30 November 2006.

Biography

Early life
Weisglas studied economics at the Erasmus University, in Rotterdam, obtaining a degree in 1970.

Politics
After his graduation, he worked for some years for the Dutch foreign service, being part of the Permanent Mission of the Kingdom of the Netherlands to the United Nations (1970–1977). He then worked as a secretary to the Dutch Minister for Development Cooperation (1978–1981). In 1982, he became an elected member of the House of Representatives, where he focused on foreign and European affairs.

In 2002, Weisglas was elected Speaker of the House, after Jeltje van Nieuwenhoven of the Labour Party stepped down. He was the first Speaker of the House to be elected (and re-elected in 2003) by a democratic vote among parliamentarians without requiring royal approval.

On 15 August 2006 he announced that he would not be a candidate in the 2006 Dutch general election, ending his 24-year-old career as a politician. His last day as Speaker of the House was on 30 November 2006.

Trivia
He is an ambassador for Terre des hommes.

Decorations

References

External links

Official
  Drs. F.W. (Frans) Weisglas Parlement & Politiek

1946 births
Living people
Dutch expatriates in Italy
Dutch expatriates in Switzerland
Dutch Jews
Dutch nonprofit directors
Dutch political commentators
Erasmus University Rotterdam alumni
Grand Cordons of the Order of Independence (Jordan)
Jewish Dutch politicians
Knights of the Order of the Netherlands Lion
Knights of the Order of Orange-Nassau
Members of the House of Representatives (Netherlands)
Politicians from Rotterdam
Politicians from The Hague
People's Party for Freedom and Democracy politicians
Speakers of the House of Representatives (Netherlands)
20th-century Dutch civil servants
20th-century Dutch diplomats
20th-century Dutch economists
20th-century Dutch politicians
21st-century Dutch economists
21st-century Dutch politicians